John 20:22 is the twenty-second verse of the twentieth chapter of the Gospel of John in the New Testament. It records Jesus giving the Spirit to the disciples during his first appearance after the resurrection. Jesus gives Holy Spirit

Content
The original Koine Greek, according to the Textus Receptus, reads:

In the King James Version of the Bible it is translated as:
And when he had said this, he breathed on them, and saith unto them, Receive ye the Holy Ghost:

The modern World English Bible translates the passage as:
When he had said this, he breathed on them, and said to them, "Receive the Holy Spirit!"

For a collection of other versions see BibleHub John 20:22

Analysis
The account of Jesus' first appearance in the Gospel of John (20:19-23) shows similarity to the account in the Gospel of Luke, that it happened in Jerusalem in the evening of his resurrection from the dead.

"He breathed on them" is from one Greek word ,  recalling .

"Received the Holy Spirit" is to equip the disciples for their missionary work (which is dependent on the mission of the Son as stated in verse 21). This represents a symbolic promise for the gift of the Spirit fifty days later at Pentecost (Acts 2). John Calvin (2. 205) notes that here the disciples were sprinkled with the grace of the Spirit, but not yet saturated with the full enduement of power until Acts 2. The giving of the Spirit at this time was linked with the forgiving on sins (verse 23).

References

Sources

External links
Jesus Appears to His Disciples

20:22
John 20:22